Hastrup is a neighbourhood of Køge in Denmark located 2 to 3 kilometres south of central Køge.

External links

Neighbourhoods in Denmark
Køge Municipality